Jasmine Kennedie is the stage name of Kyle Koritkowski, an American drag performer most known for competing on season 14 of RuPaul's Drag Race.

Early life
Jasmine Kennedie was raised in Binghamton, New York and Morgantown, West Virginia. She attended high school at Maine-Endwell High School in Endwell, New York. Her mother’s name is Joy. Her drag name comes from the character Jasmine in Aladdin and John F. Kennedy, changing the "y" in her surname to "ie"; her first drag name was Jasmine Rikers.

Career
She first appeared in public drag at age 15-16 during a Halloween party that took place at the Maine-Endwell fire department, where she dressed up as a Hooters girl.

She competed on season 14 of RuPaul's Drag Race. She placed seventh overall after being eliminated in the eleventh episode's LaLaPaRuza lip sync smackdown and attracted attention from viewers for her fights with fellow contestants Maddy Morphosis and Daya Betty.

Personal life
Jasmine Kennedie is based in Brooklyn, New York City. She came out as trans during the filming of Drag Race. She received praise from civil rights groups for coming out, according to CNN. Before doing drag, Jasmine played soccer for eight years, as well as swam and dove for three additional years.

Filmography

Television

Web series

Awards and nominations

See also 

 List of LGBT people from New York City
 List of people from Binghamton, New York

References

External links

 
 Jasmine Kennedie at IMDb

Living people
American drag queens
LGBT people from New York (state)
People from Binghamton, New York
People from Brooklyn
RuPaul's Drag Race contestants
Transgender drag performers
Year of birth missing (living people)